Sandra Scalzi (born 17 March 1986) is an Australian association footballer who played for Australian W-League team Adelaide United. She scored the first hat-trick in the W-league against Newcastle Jets on 31 October 2008.

References

Australian women's soccer players
Living people
Adelaide United FC (A-League Women) players
A-League Women players
1986 births
Women's association football forwards